Mardi McConnochie (born 1971) is an Australian author and playwright.

She is the author of three novels, Coldwater (2001), The Snow Queen (2003), Fivestar (2005), several plays and two books for children, Melissa, Queen of Evil (2006) and Dangerous Games (2007). McConnochie's novels have grappled with questions about celebrity and the possibilities open to women and women artists.

As well as novels, McConnochie has written for the stage and for television. Her television credits include Home and Away, Always Greener, McLeod's Daughters and Pacific Drive.

McConnochie lives in Sydney with her partner, the novelist, James Bradley.

Life and work
McConnochie was born in Armidale, New South Wales and raised in Adelaide, South Australia. She has a PhD in English Literature from the University of Sydney.

McConnochie's novels have grappled with questions about celebrity and the possibilities open to women and women artists. The first, Coldwater, transplants the Brontë sisters to a penal colony off the coast of New South Wales, using their plight to explore different approaches to art, life and love. It was shortlisted in the "Best First Book (SE Asia and Pacific Region)" category for the Commonwealth Writers Prize, and was named by The Washington Post as one of the Books of the Year.

Her second novel, The Snow Queen is set in Adelaide and tells the story of a former Russian ballerina stranded in post-war Australia. It saw McConnochie voted one of the Best Young Australian Novelists by The Sydney Morning Herald in 2004.

Her third novel, Fivestar focuses on contemporary notions of celebrity, charting the rise and fall of an antipodean girl group reminiscent of The Spice Girls.

Melissa, Queen of Evil, her first novel for children, won the 2006 Aurealis Award for Best Children's Novel.

The Flooded Earth (Also known as "Quest of the Sunfish") won the Best Children's Fiction prize at the US 2019 Green Earth Book Awards.

Novels 

 Coldwater (2001)
 The Snow Queen (2003)
 Fivestar (2005)
 The Voyagers (2011)
  Quest of the Sunfish: Escape to the Moon Islands  (2016)
 Quest of the Sunfish: The Castle in the Sea (2017)
  Quest of the Sunfish: The Skeleton Coast (2017)

References
Baum, Caroline: Under the covers, The Sydney Morning Herald, July 24, 2004.
Selinger-Morris, Samantha: Every plot a drama, The Sydney Morning Herald, July 2, 2005.
Griffin, Michelle: Free-floating stars, The Age, August 14, 2005.

Specific

External links

1971 births
21st-century Australian novelists
Australian women novelists
Australian screenwriters
Australian children's writers
Living people
Writers from Adelaide
Writers from Sydney
Australian women children's writers
21st-century Australian women writers
21st-century Australian screenwriters